Joshua Jennifer Espinoza (born December 17, 1987) is an American poet from Riverside, California. She is a Visiting Professor of English at Occidental College in Los Angeles, California.

Espinoza's works have been published in Poetry Magazine, PEN America, Lambda Literary, The Offing, Shabby Doll House, Electric Cereal, Voicemail Poems, and The Rumpus.

Espinoza's work covers topics like mental illness, coming out as a transgender woman, as well as universal themes like love, grief, anger, and beauty.

Bibliography 

 i'm alive / it hurts / i love it. Boost House. 2014 
 THERE SHOULD BE FLOWERS. Civil Coping Mechanisms, 2016. 
 Outside Of The Body There Is Something Like Hope. Big Lucks Books. 2018. 
 I'm Alive. It Hurts. I Love It. (Second Edition) Big Lucks Books. 2019.

References

External links 
 THERE SHOULD BE FLOWERS, book review at goodreads.com 
 Interview, at upthestaircase.org
 The shared experiences of poetry with Joshua Jennifer Espinoza, at thecreativeindependent.com

1987 births
Living people
American women poets
American LGBT poets
English-language poets
Transgender women
Writers from Riverside, California
21st-century American poets
Patreon creators
21st-century American women writers
American transgender writers